UDPG may refer to:

 Uridine diphosphate glucose
 Uridine diphosphate glucuronic acid